Gastrotheca gemma is a newly discovered species of frog that is found in the Cordillera de Colán National Sanctuary in the country of Peru. It is included in the genus Gastrotheca.

References

gemma